The Seven Grievances (Manchu:  nadan koro) was a manifesto announced by Nurhaci, khan of the Later Jin, on the thirteenth day of the fourth lunar month in the third year of the Tianming era of his reign; 7 May 1618. It effectively declared war against the Ming dynasty.

The seven grievances are:
 The Ming killed Nurhaci's father and grandfather without reason;
 The Ming suppressed Jianzhou and favored Yehe and Hada clans;
 The Ming violated agreement of territories with Nurhaci;
 The Ming sent troops to protect Yehe against Jianzhou;
 The Ming supported Yehe to break its promise to Nurhaci;
 The Ming forced Nurhaci to give up the lands in Chaihe, Sancha, and Fuan;
 The Ming's official Shang Bozhi abused his power and rode roughshod over the people.

After the announcement of the Seven Grievances, the attack on Fushun started. Han defectors played a very important role in the Qing conquest of China.  Han Chinese Generals who defected to the Manchu were often given women from the Imperial Aisin Gioro family in marriage while the ordinary soldiers who defected were often given non-royal Manchu women as wives. The Manchu leader Nurhaci married one of his granddaughters to the Ming General Li Yongfang (李永芳) after he surrendered Fushun in Liaoning to the Manchu in 1618. The offspring of Li received the "Third Class Viscount" title. In retaliation, a year later, a Ming punitive force of about 100,000 men, which included Korean and Yehe troops, approached Nurhaci's Manchus along four different routes. The Manchus scored successive victories, the most decisive being the battle of Sarhu in which Nurhaci defeated Ming dynasty and Korean troops that were far superior in numbers and armaments.

The Ming dynasty was wearied by a combination of internal strife and constant harassment by the Manchu. On May 26, 1644, Beijing fell to a peasant rebel army led by Li Zicheng. During the turmoil, the last Ming emperor Zhu Youjian hanged himself on a tree in the imperial garden outside the Forbidden City. The Manchus then allied with Ming general Wu Sangui and seized control of Beijing and overthrew Li Zicheng's short-lived Shun dynasty, establishing the Qing dynasty rule in China.

See also
Manchuria under Ming rule

Notes

References

External links 
 

Manifestos
Ming dynasty
Qing dynasty
1618 in China